Highway 23 is a major road intended for travel by the public in north eastern Saskatchewan between Highway 55 near Carrot River to Highway 9 at Bertwell. Highway 23 is paved for the majority of its length, but has a  gravel section between Weekes and Highway 55.

Major intersections
From south to north:

References

023